Holden Fortunato Gonzalez (born May 7, 1995) is an American football placekicker for the Carolina Panthers of the National Football League (NFL). He played college football at Arizona State University and was drafted by the Cleveland Browns in the seventh round of the 2017 NFL Draft. Gonzalez holds the NCAA Division I record for field goals made in a career.  He was a unanimous All-American in 2016. He was awarded the Lou Groza Award in 2016.

College career
Arizona State University signed Gonzalez on March 28, 2013. He played college football for the Sun Devils from 2013 to 2016.

During his freshman year in 2013, Gonzalez played every game, connecting on 25 of 30 (83.3%) field goals on the season and converted all 63 extra point attempts. Gonzalez had a streak of 18 field goals converted, an ASU freshman record. He was awarded with a First Team All-Pac-12 selection. Gonzalez broke the ASU record for points by a kicker with 138 on the season along with tying the NCAA record for field goals made by a freshman.

During his sophomore year in 2014, Gonzalez connected on 22 of 27 (81.5%) field goals and was 50–52 on extra points. Gonzalez was awarded with a Second-Team All-Pac-12 selection. On October 18, he matched a then-career high with four field goals against Stanford. On November 11, Gonzalez kicked four field goals including a game-winning field goal in overtime against Utah. He was named the Pac-12 Special Teams Player of the Week. On December 27, Gonzalez kicked three field goals in the 2014 Sun Bowl.

During his junior season in 2015, Gonzalez scored on 26 of 34 (76.5) field goals and converted all 52 extra point attempts. On November 28, Gonzalez matched the Pac-12 record with an ASU school record six field goals against California. On January 2, 2016, he kicked four field goals against West Virginia in the 2016 Cactus Bowl. In the third quarter, he became the school's all-time scoring leader, surpassing Luis Zendejas (380).

During his senior year in 2016, Gonzalez recorded 23-of-25 (92.0%) field goals and only missed one of 40 extra point attempts. On September 16, Gonzalez kicked four field goals against UTSA. He is the first Sun Devil in history to kick more than one 50-yarder in a game. With his second field goal of the night early in the second quarter, Zane Gonzalez broke the Pac-12 record for points scored in a career with his 416th. He was named the Pac-12 Special Teams Player of the Week. On September 24, Gonzalez kicked three field goals and six extra points against California. With his three field goals, Gonzalez moved into 4th in NCAA history for career field goals made at 84. Gonzalez's first field goal of the night broke the school record for career made field goals. He was named the Pac-12 Special Teams Player of the Week. On October 8, he kicked three field goals against UCLA. Gonzalez broke the NCAA career field goals made record with his 89th career field goal in the fourth quarter. He was named the Pac-12 Special Teams Player of the Week for the third time. On October 15, he kicked three field goals against Colorado. He holds the record for career points by a kicker with 468, passing FSU’s Dustin Hopkins (466). He also tied the NCAA record for most 50+ yard field goals in a game with three. He was named to his fourth Pac-12 Special Teams Player of the Week, becoming the second player to ever do this, joining California kicker Doug Brien. On December 8, he was awarded the Lou Groza Award, become the second player in ASU history, joining Thomas Weber (2007). On December 12, he was named a unanimous All-American, becoming the third in school history and the first since Terrell Suggs earned the honor in 2002.

In the 2017 Senior Bowl, Gonzalez kicked three field goals, tying a record that had been held since 1985.

Professional career

Cleveland Browns

2017 season 
The Cleveland Browns selected Gonzalez in the seventh round (224th overall) of the 2017 NFL Draft. On May 16, 2017, the Browns signed him to a four-year, $2.48 million contract with a signing bonus of $89,156. Gonzalez competed with incumbent kicker Cody Parkey for the starting job during Cleveland's 2017 training camp. The Browns decided on Gonzalez as their kicker for the season on September 1, 2017.

On September 10, 2017, in the season-opening 21–18 loss to the Pittsburgh Steelers, Gonzalez recorded his first career extra point and field goal, which was a 24-yard attempt. On October 22, 2017, in a Week 7 12–9 loss to the Tennessee Titans, he scored all nine points on three field goals, including a career-long of 54 yards. Overall, in the 2017 season, he converted 25 of 26 extra point attempts and 15 of 20 field goal attempts.

2018 season 
In Week 1, in the 21–21 tie against the Pittsburgh Steelers, Gonzalez had a game-winning 43-yard attempt blocked in overtime that would have given the Browns the win. On September 16, in a Week 2 21–18 loss to the New Orleans Saints, Gonzalez missed two field goals and two extra points, including a PAT that would have given the Browns a 19–18 lead. He concluded the game by missing a 52-yard field goal with 3 seconds left, sealing the loss. He was waived by the Browns the following day, September 17.

Arizona Cardinals
On November 20, 2018, Gonzalez was signed to the Arizona Cardinals practice squad. He was promoted to the active roster on November 26, 2018, following an injury to Phil Dawson.

On December 2, 2018, in a Week 13 20–17 win against the Green Bay Packers, Gonzalez recorded two field goals and extra points which included the 44-yard go-ahead field goal that eventually gave the Cardinals the win.

Gonzalez re-signed with the Cardinals on April 23, 2020. He was placed on injured reserve on December 19, 2020. Gonzalez was released on March 5, 2021.

Detroit Lions
Gonzalez signed with the Detroit Lions on August 10, 2021. He was waived on August 31, 2021, and re-signed to the practice squad the next day.

Carolina Panthers
On September 14, 2021, Gonzalez was signed by the Carolina Panthers off the Lions practice squad. In Week 8, Gonzalez converted all four of his field goal attempts, and accounted for 13 points in the Panthers 19–13 win over the Falcons, earning NFC Special Teams Player of the Week. In Week 10, Gonzalez had another perfect game, converting all four field goals in a 34–10 win over the Cardinals, earning another NFC Special Teams Player of the Week honor. In week 15's matchup against the Buffalo Bills, Gonzalez suffered a quad injury in warm-ups, and had to be placed on injured reserve after the game, ending his season.

On March 9, 2022, Gonzalez signed a one-year contract extension with the Panthers. On August 30, 2022, Gonzalez was placed on injured reserve after injuring his quad during the last preseason game while warming up.

References

External links
Arizona Cardinals bio
Arizona State Sun Devils bio

1995 births
Living people
American sportspeople of Mexican descent
American Christians
People with obsessive–compulsive disorder
People from Deer Park, Texas
Players of American football from Texas
Sportspeople from Harris County, Texas
American football placekickers
Arizona State Sun Devils football players
All-American college football players
Cleveland Browns players
Arizona Cardinals players
Detroit Lions players
Carolina Panthers players